Johann Peter Uz (October 3, 1720 – May 12, 1796) was a German poet.

Life
He was born at Ansbach.
He studied law in 1739–43 at the university of Halle, where he associated with the poets Johann Gleim and Johann Nikolaus Götz, and in conjunction with the latter translated the odes of Anacreon (1746).

In 1748 Uz was appointed unpaid secretary to the Justizcollegium, an office he held for twelve years; in 1763 he became assessor to the imperial court of justice at Nuremberg, in 1790 was made a judge.

A monument to Uz stands in the Ansbach Court Garden.  It was near this monument, in 1833, that Kaspar Hauser was murdered.

References

Attribution

1720 births
1796 deaths
People from Ansbach
People from the Principality of Ansbach
18th-century German poets
German male poets
18th-century German male writers